The 1931 Swedish Ice Hockey Championship was the 10th season of the Swedish Ice Hockey Championship, the national championship of Sweden. Sodertalje SK won the championship.

Tournament

Qualification 
 Nacka SK - UoIF Matteuspojkarna 1:1/3:0
 Hammarby IF - Tranebergs IF 7:0
 Lilijanshofs IF - IFK Stockholm 3:1

Quarterfinals 
 Djurgårdens IF - Nacka SK 2:1
 Hammarby IF - Lilijanshofs IF 4:0
 AIK - Karlbergs BK 3:0
 Södertälje SK - IK Göta 5:0

Semifinals 
 Djurgårdens IF - Hammarby IF 1:2
 AIK - Södertälje SK 0:1

Final 
 Hammarby IF - Södertälje SK 0:2

External links
 Season on hockeyarchives.info  

Cham
Swedish Ice Hockey Championship seasons